Christos Kiourkos (born 1972) is a retired Greek football goalkeeper.

References

1972 births
Living people
Chaidari F.C. players
Kallithea F.C. players
Ethnikos Asteras F.C. players
Panachaiki F.C. players
Vyzas F.C. players
Agios Dimitrios F.C. players
Super League Greece players
Association football goalkeepers
Footballers from Athens
Greek footballers